Middle Fork I Township is a township in Forsyth County, North Carolina, United States. As of the 2010 Census, it had a population of 1,710. Middle Fork I Township was formed in April 2003, when Middle Fork Township was split into Middle Fork I Township and Middle Fork II Township.

References

Townships in Forsyth County, North Carolina
Townships in North Carolina